The year 1700 in architecture involved some significant events.

Events
 March 27 – François de Rohan, prince de Soubise, buys the Hôtel de Clisson, which is subsequently remodelled by Pierre-Alexis Delamair.
 A new facade is built on the Cathedral Basilica of St. Peter Apostle at Frascati, Italy.

Buildings and structures

Buildings completed
 
 Brown House, Rehoboth, Massachusetts, USA
 Castillo de San Pedro de la Roca, Santiago de Cuba (begun 1638), by Giovanni Battista Antonelli
 DeWint House, Tappan, New York, USA, by Daniel DeClark
 Federal Hall, New York City
 Hill Court Manor, Ross-on-Wye, England
 Rossie House, Angus, Scotland, by Alexander Edward
 Slushko Palace, Vilnius, Lithuania (begun c.1690), by Giovanni Pietro Perti
 Tessin Palace, Stockholm (begun 1694), by Nicodemus Tessin the Younger
 Upper Chapel, Sheffield, England, by followers of Timothy Jollie
 Wren Building, College of William & Mary, Williamsburg, Virginia, USA (begun 1695)

Births
 May 12 – Luigi Vanvitelli, Italian engineer and architect (died 1773)
 August 27 – Carl Hårleman, Swedish architect (died 1753)
 date unknown
 Santiago Bonavía, Italian architect and painter (died 1760)
 Bartolomeo Rastrelli (died 1771)

Deaths
 September 15 – André Le Nôtre, French landscape architect (born 1613)
 date unknown – Hans van Steenwinckel the Youngest, Danish architect and sculptor (born 1639)

architecture
Years in architecture
18th-century architecture